The Social Democratic League (SDB) was a socialist political party in the Netherlands. Founded in 1881, the SDB was the first socialist party to enter the House of Representatives.

Party history

Before 1881
In the 1860s a socialist movement began to develop in the Netherlands. The development was aided by the foundation of the First International  and the foundation of the first trade unions.

Most of those unions however were united in the moderate  (General Dutch Workingmans' Association; ANWV) in 1871, which was founded by Protestants and liberals to combat the influence of the Dutch section of the First International. Some prominent Dutch representatives of the First International joined the ANWV in order to radicalise the organisation. In 1878 they, led by Willem Ansigh, left the ANWV to found the Sociaal-Democratische Vereeniging (Social-Democratic Association; SDV). It had branches in major cities like Amsterdam, The Hague, Haarlem and Rotterdam

1881–1893: Social Democratic League
The SDB was founded in 1881 by members of the SDV and similar local socialist parties. The strongest of these local socialist parties were located in the poor rural province Friesland. The party was based on Marxist principles and therefore expected a proletarian revolution. In 1882 Ferdinand Domela Nieuwenhuis, a lapsed Lutheran minister, was elected as general secretary of the party. He would hold this position until 1887 and grow to become the party's strongman, he retained the position when he was in prison in 1886–1887 for insulting the monarchy. The party published the paper "Justice for All" (Recht voor Allen) of which Domela was editor. The SDB was also affiliated to the League for General Suffrage, which was a dominantly liberal organisation which campaigned for universal suffrage.

In 1888, despite the party's revolutionary orientation it decided to participate in the election. Domela Nieuwenhuis was elected to the House of Representatives for the district of Schoterland. The party was supported by the liberal Frisian People's Party (Friesche Volkspartij). Domela Nieuwenhuis won the seat in the second round with the support from the Protestant Anti-Revolutionary Party, which preferred a socialist over a liberal MP. In parliament Domela Nieuwenhuis tried to gain attention for the interests of the Dutch workers, but he was ignored by other MPs.

In the 1891 general election Domela decided not stand for reelection. His seat was taken by Willem Treub, a member of the left-liberal Radical League. This electoral defeat led to debate within the party. A group of 'moderates' wanted to continue the parliamentary work and the reformist course, another group, led by Domela Nieuwenhuis, wanted to pursue an anti-parliamentary course with a strong anarchist orientation. This led to a split; during the SDB party conference of 1893 in Groningen, a majority voted to stop participating in the elections. A minority of members led by Pieter Jelles Troelstra tried to prevent this, and later left the party in order to create a new party. The split mirrored a larger conflict in the First International between reformists and revolutionaries, and Marxists and anarchists.

1893–1900: Socialists' League
In 1893 the SDB was forbidden by the court because the party had promoted illegal means to attain its goal. In response the party renamed itself Socialists' League (Socialistenbond, SB). When the anarchist elements began to take full control of the SDB, important regional social democratic figures joined the group around Troelstra. Together they formed a group called "the twelve apostles". They founded the Social Democratic Workers' Party (SDAP) in 1894. In 1896 the radical wing of the party, led by Domela Nieuwenhuis, left the SB and continued without a party organisation. They chose for an anarchist course and direct action. They founded the paper De Vrije Socialist ("The Free Socialist") and became strongly linked to the Nationaal Arbeidssecretariaat (National Workers' Secretariat; NAS) an anarcho-syndicalist union founded in 1893. In 1901 the district of Schoterland elected the independent Socialist candidate, Geert van der Zwaag as its MP. His views were similar to those of Domela Nieuwenhuis in the 1880s. In 1900 the SB joined the SDAP which had become electorally successful. When Domela Nieuwenhuis died in 1919 the anarchist movement in the Netherlands lost significance.

Name
Before the Russian Revolution the term social democrat, socialist and communist were used interchangeably to denote a Marxist ideology. Social democrat was not more or less radical than socialist. The organisations called itself League (Bond) because it did not see itself as a party in the traditional sense. It was entrenched in the extra-parliamentary opposition and only entered elections once.

Ideology and issues
The SDB was a Marxist party and it saw a socialist revolution, which would replace the capitalist system with a socialist one, as inevitable. Important issues for the party were the prohibition of alcohol, the abolition of the army and the replacement of the monarchy with a republic and the independence of the Dutch East Indies.

Practical social-economic reforms the party wanted to implement were the free education, better pay for teachers, a ban on child labour, a limited working day for women, the implementation of a system of social security and a better housing for workers.

Representation
This table shows the SDB's results in elections to the House of Representatives and Senate, as well as the party's political leadership: the fractievoorzitter is the chair of the parliamentary party and the, in this case sole, candidate in the general election, these posts are normally taken by the party's leader.

Electorate
The electorate of the SDB was mainly located in the poor rural province of Friesland. In the 1888 the party profited from the extension of suffrage to small farmers and other members of the middle class. In the second round the support of the Protestant ARP was crucial. They supported the SDB because they preferred a socialist over a liberal. In the 1890s the party began to win support in the poor rural province of Groningen and larger cities like Amsterdam and Zaandam. The SDAP would however soon overtake the party in these regions.

Defunct socialist parties in the Netherlands
Second International
Political parties established in 1881
1881 establishments in the Netherlands
Political parties disestablished in 1900
1900 disestablishments in the Netherlands